Modanath Prasrit, also Modnath Prasrit  (born 20 June 1942) is a Nepali writer, politician and political activist. A long time member of the Nepali communist movement, he became the Minister of Education in 2054 BS (A.D. none). His writings reflect his communist ideology. His book Devasur Sangram (Translation: War between Gods and Demons) is particularly noted for its challenge to Hindu orthodoxy.

Biography
Prasrit was born Modanath Paudel on 20 June 1942, in Khidim, Arghakhanchi, to Ghanashyam Paudel and Balikadevi.
He has Master's degree in Nepali language and a title of 'Acharya' in Ayurvedic Medicine. He was awarded the Madan Puraskar for Nepali literature in 2023 B.S. (1966–67 A.D.) for the  epic Maanav. He has continued to publish a prolific list of works in literature and socio-political commentary since then. Prasrit was an important intellectual figure in the Nepali struggle for Democracy during the Panchayat rule.

Political views 
Modanath Prasrit is generally considered a "progressive" writer, although some within the movement claim he has joined the "reactionary" camp in recent years. He has surprised many with his stance for reinstating Nepal as a Hindu nation, reverting secularism, while also opining that there was no justification for a Hindu state in the first place. He has also shown a soft spot for traditional Hindu poets like Bhanubhakta Acharya

List of works

He has published a total of 2 epic poems, 2 long poems and 235 poems and songs in total. In addition, he regularly contributes his social, cultural and political commentary on newspapers, magazines, talk shows and conferences.

Awards
In 2014, he was awarded the Ujjwal Kirtimaya Rashtradeep (second class), a national honour, by a cabinet decision, for his contributions to society.

References

Living people
Nepalese poets
20th-century Nepalese poets
21st-century Nepalese poets
Communist Party of Nepal (Unified Marxist–Leninist) politicians
Nepali Congress politicians from Lumbini Province
Nepalese writers
1942 births
Nepal MPs 1994–1999
People from Arghakhanchi District